Unionville, Illinois may refer to:
Unionville, Massac County, Illinois, an unincorporated community in Massac County
Unionville, Vermilion County, Illinois, an unincorporated community in Vermilion County
Unionville, Whiteside County, Illinois, an unincorporated community in Whiteside County
Streator, Illinois, formerly known as Unionville